Watsa Territory is an administrative area in the Haut-Uele province of the Democratic Republic of the Congo.
The administrative center is the town of Watsa.

Security issues

During the Second Congo War (1998-2003), in August 1998, Ugandan troops occupied areas of Haut Uele including the town of Durba, the site of the Gorumbwa, Durba and Agbarabo gold mines. Almost one ton of gold was extracted during the four-year period of occupation, worth about $9 million at the time.

At the end of September 2009, fighters from the Lord's Resistance Army LRA combatants were said to have attacked a number
of villages in the Durba/Watsa mining area.
As of April 2010 Watsa Territory was thought to have about 13,960 Internally Displaced People.

Divisions
The territory is divided into sectors and chiefdoms:
Andobi Chiefdom
Kebo Chiefdom
Ateru Chiefdom
Andikofa Chiefdom
Gombari Sector
Mari-Minza Chiefdom
Walese Chiefdom
Mangbutu Sector
Kibali Sector

References

Territories of Haut-Uélé Province